Mohammadabad-e Chah-e Malek (also Romanized as Moḩammadābād-e Chāh-e Malek; also known as Moḩammadābād) is a village in Rigan Rural District, in the Central District of Rigan County, Kerman Province, Iran. At the 2006 census, its population was 246, in 46 families.

References 

Populated places in Rigan County